William Alexander Percy (May 14, 1885 – January 21, 1942), was a lawyer, planter, and poet from Greenville, Mississippi. His autobiography Lanterns on the Levee (Knopf 1941) became a bestseller.  His father LeRoy Percy was the last United States Senator from Mississippi elected by the legislature.  In a largely Protestant state, the younger Percy championed the Roman Catholicism of his French mother.

Life and career
He was born to Camille, a French Catholic, and LeRoy Percy, of the planter class in Mississippi, and grew up in Greenville. His father was elected as US senator in 1910. As an attorney and planter with 20,000 acres under cultivation for cotton, he was very influential at the Episcopal university, The University of the South in Sewanee, Tennessee, a postbellum tradition in his family. He graduated in 1904. 

He spent a year in Paris before going to Harvard for a law degree. After returning to Greenville, Percy joined his father's firm in the practice of law.

During World War I, Percy joined the Commission for Relief in Belgium in November 1916. He served in Belgium as a delegate until the withdrawal of American personnel upon the US declaration of war in April 1917. He served in the US Army in World War I, earning the rank of Captain and the Croix de Guerre.

From 1925 to 1932, Percy edited the Yale Younger Poets series, the first of its kind in the country.  He also published four volumes of poetry with the Yale University Press.  A Southern man of letters, Percy befriended many fellow writers, Southern, Northern and European, including William Faulkner. He socialized with Langston Hughes and other people in and about the Harlem Renaissance. Percy was a sort of godfather to the Fugitives at Vanderbilt, or Southern Agrarians, as John Crowe Ransom, Allen Tate and Robert Penn Warren were often called.

Percy's family was plagued with suicides, including that of his first cousin LeRoy Pratt Percy and possibly his wife, Martha Susan (Mattie Sue) Phinizy Percy, who died in a car accident. William adopted his cousin's children, Walker, LeRoy (Roy) and Phinizy (Phin) Percy, after they were orphaned. As adults, all three prospered.  Walker became a medical doctor and a best-selling author. Roy married Sarah Hunt Farish, the daughter of Will Percy's law partner, Hazlewood Power Farish. He took charge of the Percy family plantation, Trail Lake. Phin married and moved to New Orleans to practice law.

Percy's most well-known work is his memoir, Lanterns on the Levee: Recollections of a Planter's Son (Alfred A. Knopf, New York 1941). His other works include the text of "They Cast Their Nets in Galilee," which is included in the Episcopal Hymnal (1982) (Hymn 661), and the Collected Poems (Knopf 1943). One of his pieces was published under the name A. W. Percy in Men and Boys, an anonymous anthology of Uranian poetry (New York, 1934).

Percy was the playwright behind a one-act scene in a volume of poetry, "In April Once" (1920).

A friend of Herbert Hoover from the Belgium Relief Effort during the early years of World War I, Percy was put in charge of relief during the Great Mississippi Flood of 1927, when an area larger than all New England minus Maine was flooded in the spring.  During the flood, thousands of blacks, fleeing farms and plantations under water, were forced to seek refuge on the narrow rim of the levee in Greenville. Percy believed that the refugees needed to be evacuated to Vicksburg to receive better care and food, and he arranged for ships to prepare to remove them. However, LeRoy Percy and local planters prevented the evacuation, and the refugees remaining on the levee were forced to work in conditions that many compared to slavery. The Colored Advisory Commission led by Robert Russa Moton, formed to investigate abuses that had taken place during the flood, named the Greenville camp as one where black refugees complained of poor treatment.

Legacy and honors
 The William Alexander Percy Library at 341 Main Street, Greenville, Mississippi is named for him.

Family
Walker Percy
Charles "Don Carlos" Percy
LeRoy Percy
Thomas George Percy

References

Baker, Lewis (1983) The Percys of Mississippi:  Politics and Literature in the New South. Louisiana State University Press.
Barry, John (1998) Rising Tide. Simon & Schuster. 
Kirwan, Albert Dennis (1964) The Revolt of the Rednecks.  P. Smith.
Percy, William Alexander (1941) Lanterns on the Levee: Recollections of a Planter's Son. Alfred A. Knopf. . Reprinted with new introduction by Walker Percy, Louisiana State University Press, 1973.
Percy, William Alexander Sewanee. New York: Frederic C. Beil, 1982. Introduction (1982) by Walker Percy; illustrated by Katherine Pettigrew.

Wyatt-Brown, Bertram (1994) The House of Percy:  Honor, Melancholy, and Imagination in a Southern Family. Oxford University Press.

External links

 American Experience: "Fatal Flood" - Percy bio and his participation in events after the Mississippi Flood of 1927
 A Take On Percy's Involvement in the Great Mississippi Flood of 1927
 William Alexander Percy Collection (MUM00361) owned by the University of Mississippi Department of Archives and Special Collections.
 
 

1885 births
1942 deaths
American people of French descent
People from Greenville, Mississippi
People from Monteagle, Tennessee
Poets from Mississippi
20th-century American poets
Sewanee: The University of the South alumni
Harvard Law School alumni
United States Army officers
United States Army personnel of World War I
20th-century American memoirists
American male poets
20th-century American male writers
American expatriates in France
American male non-fiction writers
Percy family of Mississippi